is a passenger railway station located in the Ikuta neighborhood of Tama-ku, Kawasaki, Kanagawa, Japan and operated by the private railway operator Odakyu Electric Railway.

Lines

Station layout
The station consists of two opposed elevated side platforms serving two tracks, which are connected to the station building by a footbridge.

Platforms

History
It was promoted from a local train stop in 1945, to a “Semi-Express” stop in 1946, a “Sakura Semi-Express” stop in 1948, and a “Rush Hour Semi-Express” stop in 1964. It became a “Section Semi-Express” stop in 2004.

Station numbering was introduced in January 2014 with Ikuta being assigned station number OH20.

Passenger statistics
In fiscal 2019, the station was used by an average of 46,037 passengers daily.

The passenger figures for previous years are as shown below.

Surrounding area
Universities such as Meiji University, Senshu University, and St. Marianna University School of Medicine are scattered in the vicinity, and it is becoming a student district.

See also
 List of railway stations in Japan

References

External links

 Odakyu Station Guide (Japanese)

Railway stations in Kanagawa Prefecture
Railway stations in Japan opened in 1927
Odakyu Odawara Line
Railway stations in Kawasaki, Kanagawa